Cherki is an Arabic word meaning "eastern", or "oriental".

Cherki may also refer to:

People
Alice Cherki (born 1936), Algerian psychoanalyst.
Oury Amos Cherki (born 1959), French-Israeli rabbi.
Pascal Cherki (born 1966), French politician.
Rayan Cherki (born 2003), French footballer.

Place
Oulad Cherki, a small town in Morocco.